Marble Township may refer to:

 Marble Township, Madison County, Arkansas
 Marble Township, Saline County, Arkansas, in Saline County, Arkansas
 Marble Township, Lincoln County, Minnesota
 Marble Township, Saunders County, Nebraska

Township name disambiguation pages